James Robertson Justice (15 June 1907 – 2 July 1975) was a British actor. He is best remembered for portraying pompous authority figures in comedies including each of the seven films in the Doctor series. He also co-starred with Gregory Peck in several adventure movies, notably The Guns of Navarone. Born in south-east London, he exaggerated his Scottish roots but was prominent in Scottish public life, helping to launch Scottish Television (STV) and serving as Rector of the University of Edinburgh (1957-60 and 1963-66).

Biography
The son of Aberdeen-born mining engineer James Norval Justice and Edith (née Burgess), James Robertson Justice was born James Norval Harald Justice in Lee, a suburb of Lewisham in South East  London, in 1907. Educated at Marlborough College in Wiltshire, Justice studied science at University College London, but left after a year and became a geology student at the University of Bonn, where he again left after just a year. He spoke many languages (possibly up to 20) including English, Spanish, French, Greek, Danish, Russian, German, Italian, Dutch and Gaelic.

After university

Justice returned to the UK in 1927, and became a journalist with Reuters in London alongside Ian Fleming, the creator of James Bond. After a year, he emigrated to Canada, where he worked as an insurance salesman, taught English at a boys' school, became a lumberjack and mined for gold. He came back to Britain penniless, working his passage on a Dutch freighter washing dishes in the ship's galley to pay his fare.

On his return to Britain, he served as secretary of the British Ice Hockey Association in the early 1930s and managed the national team at the 1932 European Championships in Berlin to a seventh-place finish. He combined his administrative duties in 1931–32 with a season as goalie with the London Lions.

Justice was entered in a Wolseley Hornet Special in the JCC Thousand Mile Race at Brooklands on 3 and 4 May 1932. The car was unplaced. The following year a "J. Justice (J.A.P. Special)" competed in the Brighton Speed Trials: "Justice's machine 'Tallulah' noisily expired before the end of the course, and was pushed back to the start by way of the arcade under the terrace." The Brighton event was won by Whitney Straight and according to Denis Jenkinson: "Flitting round the periphery of the team was James Robertson Justice." In February 1934, Straight took delivery of a new Maserati: "Jimmy Justice went off to Italy to collect the first car which was 8CM number 3011." Motor Sport reported in 1963: "We remember him at Lewes with a G.N. and in a Relay Race with a Wolseley Hornet."

Justice left Britain again to become a policeman for the League of Nations in the Territory of the Saar Basin (a region of Germany occupied and governed by France and Germany under a League of Nations mandate originating in the Treaty of Versailles). After the Nazis came to power, he fought in the Spanish Civil War on the Republican side. It was here that he first grew his signature bushy beard, which he retained throughout his career. On returning to Britain, he joined the Royal Naval Volunteer Reserve, but after sustaining a wound in 1943 (thought to be shrapnel from a German shell), he was honourably discharged from the service with a pension.

Love of Scotland
He married nurse Dillys Hayden (1914–1984) in Chelsea in 1941, and they had a son named James. On his return from the war, he reinvented himself with stronger Scottish roots, dispensing with his two middle names and acquiring the new middle name Robertson out of his habit of wearing Robertson tartan. Feeling strongly about his Scottish ancestry, he once claimed to have been born in 1905 under a distillery on the Isle of Skye; many sources listed his birthplace as Wigtown, Wigtownshire. He lived in Wigtown at Orchardton House between 1946 and 1950. He unsuccessfully contested the North Angus and Mearns constituency for the Labour Party in the 1950 general election.

With his earnings from the film Doctor in the House (1954), Justice purchased a cottage in the Scottish Highlands village of Spinningdale. In 1966 Justice appeared as a narrator in five episodes of the BBC children's television series Jackanory, telling stories and legends from Scotland, including those of The Battle of the Birds and The Black Bull of Norroway.

Acting career
Justice pursued acting after joining the Players' Theatre in London. Under the chairmanship of Leonard Sachs, who was latterly chairman of BBC television's The Good Old Days, the club would stage Victorian music hall nights. Substituting for Sachs one night, Justice was recommended for the film For Those in Peril (1944).

With his domineering personality, bulky physique (he played rugby for Beckenham RFC First XV in the 1924–25 season alongside Johnnie Cradock who would become the partner of 1950s TV chef Fanny), and rich, booming voice, Justice was soon established as a major supporting actor in British comedy films. His first leading role was as headmaster in the film Vice Versa (1948), written and directed by Peter Ustinov, who cast Justice partly because he had been "a collaborator of my father's at Reuters."Justice made it to Walt Disney in a film adaptation of Robin Hood called The Story of Robin Hood (1952) where he took the role of Little John. Justice also was the demanding surgeon Sir Lancelot Spratt in the "Doctor" series of films of the 1950s and 1960s, beginning with Doctor in the House (1954), playing the role for which he is possibly best remembered. In his films he was sometimes credited as Seumas Mòr na Feusag (Scottish Gaelic, translation: Big James with the Beard), James R. Justice, James Robertson or James Robertson-Justice.

On 31 August 1957, he helped launch the TV station Scottish Television (STV), hosting the channel's first show, This is Scotland. From 1957 to 1960, and again from 1963 to 1966, he was Rector of the University of Edinburgh. In the war film The Guns of Navarone (1961), he had a co-starring role as well as narrating the story.

He appeared in four films with Navarone co-star Gregory Peck, including Captain Horatio Hornblower (1951), and Moby Dick (1956), in which he played the one-armed sea captain also attacked by the white whale. In the film, Justice's character tries to befriend Captain Ahab (played by Peck), but is amazed and repulsed by Ahab's obsessive pursuit of Moby Dick.

Later life
After a series of affairs and the accidental drowning of his four-year-old son in 1949 near his watermill home in Whitchurch, Hampshire, Justice separated from his wife; she eventually divorced him in 1968. He met actress Irene von Meyendorff in 1960 on the set of The Ambassador, and they remained together, eventually marrying in 1975 three days before he died.

Not long after completing his work for Chitty Chitty Bang Bang in 1968, Justice suffered a severe stroke, which signalled the beginning of the end for his career. He appeared in a number of films afterward, albeit in less prominent roles (i.e. playing his best known character of Sir Lancelot Spratt for the final time in Doctor in Trouble (1970), featured only briefly in several scenes). He suffered a further series of strokes, which left him unable to work. He was declared bankrupt in 1970, and he died penniless in 1975. His ashes were buried in a north Scotland moor near his former residence in the Highland village of Spinningdale.

A biography entitled James Robertson Justice—What's The Bleeding Time? (referring to a joke in the first Doctor film) was published by Tomahawk Press on 3 March 2008. It was written by James Hogg, Robert Sellers and Howard Watson.

Filmography

 For Those in Peril (1944, first screen appearance) as Operation Room Officer (uncredited)
 Champagne Charlie (1944) as Patron (uncredited)
 Fiddlers Three (1944) as Centurion of the 8th Legion
 Appointment with Crime (1946) as Prison Governor
 Hungry Hill (1947) as Minor Role (uncredited)
 Vice Versa (1948) as Dr. Grimstone
 My Brother Jonathan (1948) as Eugene Dakers
 Against the Wind (1948) as Ackerman
 Quartet (1948) as Branksome (segment "The Facts of Life")
 Scott of the Antarctic (1948) as Taff Evans / P.O. (Taff) Evans, R.N.
 Stop Press Girl (1949) as Arthur Peters
 Poet's Pub (1949) as Prof. Benbow
 Private Angelo (1949) as Feste
 Prelude to Fame (1950) as Sir Arthur Harold
 Christopher Columbus (1949) as Martín Alonso Pinzón
 Whisky Galore! (1949) as Dr. Maclaren
 The Black Rose (1950) as Simeon Beautrie
 My Daughter Joy (1950) as Prof. Keval
 The Magnet (1950) as Tramp (as Seamus Mor Na Feasag)
 Blackmailed (1951) as Mr. Sine
 Pool of London (1951) as Engine Room Officer Trotter
 Captain Horatio Hornblower (1951) as Seaman Quist
 David and Bathsheba (1951) as Abishai
 Anne of the Indies (1951) as Red Dougal
 The Lady Says No (1952) as Matthew Huntington Hatch
 The Story of Robin Hood (1952) as Little John
 Les Misérables (1952) as Robert
 Miss Robin Hood (1952) as The Macalister
 The Voice of Merrill (1952) as Jonathan Roche
 The Sword and the Rose (1953) as King Henry VIII
 Rob Roy: The Highland Rogue (1954) as John Campbell, Duke of Argyll
 Doctor in the House (1954) as Sir Lancelot Spratt
 Out of the Clouds (1955) as Captain Brent
 Above Us the Waves (1955) as Admiral Ryder
 Land of the Pharaohs (1955) as Vashtar, the Master Architect
 Doctor at Sea (1955) as Captain Hogg
 An Alligator Named Daisy (1955) as Sir James Colebrook
 Storm Over the Nile (1955) as General Burroughs
 Moby Dick (1956) as Captain Boomer
 The Iron Petticoat (1956) as Col. Sklamoff
 Checkpoint (1956) as Warren Ingram
 Doctor at Large (1957) as Sir Lancelot Spratt
 Souvenir d'Italie (1957) (uncredited)
 The Living Idol (1957) as Doctor Alfred Stoner
 Campbell's Kingdom (1957) as James MacDonald
 Seven Thunders (1957) as Dr. Martout
 Thérèse Étienne (1958) as Anton Muller
 Orders to Kill (1958) as Naval Commander
 Upstairs and Downstairs (1959) as Mansfield
 Doctor in Love (1960) as Sir Lancelot Spratt
 A French Mistress (1960) as Robert Martin / 'Bow Wow'
 The Ambassador (1960) as Robert Morrison
 Foxhole in Cairo (1960) as Capt. Robertson
 Very Important Person (1961) as Sir Ernest Pease KBE FRS / Lt. Farrow RN
 The Guns of Navarone (1961) as Commodore Jensen / Prologue Narrated by (voice)
 Raising the Wind (1961) as Sir Benjamin Boyd
 Murder, She Said (1961) as Ackenthorpe
 A Pair of Briefs (1962) as Mr. Justice Haddon
 Crooks Anonymous (1962) as Sir Harvey Russelrod
 Guns of Darkness (1962) as Hugo Bryant
  (1962) as Katov - a sculptor
 The Fast Lady (1962) as Charles Chingford
 The Lightship (1963) as Kapitän Freytag
 Mystery Submarine (1963) as RAdm. Rainbird
 Doctor in Distress (1963) as Sir Lancelot Spratt
 Dr. Crippen (1963) as Captain McKenzie
 Father Came Too! (1963) as Sir Beverley Grant
 Up from the Beach (1965) as British beachmaster
 Those Magnificent Men in their Flying Machines (1965) as Narrator (voice)
 You Must Be Joking! (1965) as Librarian
 The Face of Fu Manchu (1965) as Sir Charles
 Doctor in Clover (1966) as Sir Lancelot Spratt
 Long Legs, Long Fingers (1966) as Sir Hammond
 The Trygon Factor (1966) as Sir John (English version, voice)
 Two Weeks in September (1967) as McClintock
 Hell Is Empty (1967) as Angus McGee
 Histoires extraordinaires (1968) as Countess' Adivisor (segment "Metzengerstein")
 Mayerling (1968) as Prince of Wales
 Chitty Chitty Bang Bang (1968) as Lord Scrumptious
 Zeta One (1969) as Maj. Bourdon
 Some Will, Some Won't (1970) as Sir Charles Robson
 Doctor in Trouble (1970) as Sir Lancelot Spratt
 The Massacre of Glencoe (1971) as MacIan (final film role)

References

External links

Britmovie – James Robertson Justice
Gazetteer for Scotland James Robertson Justice

1907 births
1975 deaths
20th-century English male actors
Alumni of University College London
Anglo-Scots
British people of the Spanish Civil War
British male comedy actors
British male journalists
English ice hockey players
English male film actors
English socialists
English people of Scottish descent
Labour Party (UK) parliamentary candidates
Male actors from London
People educated at Marlborough College
People from Lee, London
People from Whitchurch, Hampshire
Rectors of the University of Edinburgh
Royal Naval Volunteer Reserve personnel of World War II
Royal Navy sailors
University of Bonn alumni